Morant Point Lighthouse is on the easternmost tip of Jamaica, and is the oldest lighthouse on the island.

Description
Erected in 1841 by Kru men from Africa (who were among the free Africans brought to Jamaica in the period following emancipation), it is the oldest lighthouse on the island and the first cast iron lighthouse built in the Western Hemisphere.

To protect against surf during hurricanes, a semicircular masonry wall has been built around the seaward side of the base of the lighthouse.

It was designed by Alexander Gordon and built by George Grove, later a leading writer on music.

It is listed by the Jamaica National Heritage Trust as a historic monument, being "of considerable interest to historians of industrial technology".

It is maintained by the Port Authority of Jamaica, an agency of the Ministry of Transport and Mining.

See also

List of lighthouses in Jamaica

Gallery

References

External links

 Aerial views

Lighthouses completed in 1841
Lighthouses in Jamaica
Buildings and structures in Saint Thomas Parish, Jamaica